Mark Stephen Harvey (born 17 September 1958) is a museum scientist and biologist. Since 1989 he has been based at the Western Australian Museum.

Career 
Harvey graduated from Monash University in 1983 with a PhD titled "Contributions to the systematics of the pseudoscorpionida (arachnida) : the genus synsphyronus chamberlin (garypidae) and the family sternophoridae".

His research interests include the systematics and evolution of arachnids and other terrestrial invertebrates.

, he is a member and Vice-President of the International Commission on Zoological Nomenclature.

Achievements, awards and recognition

Harvey was presented with the 1991 Edgeworth David Medal by the Royal Society of New South Wales, and the Bonnet Award by the International Society of Arachnology in 2013.

In 2017, he was awarded the Distinguished Career Award by the Society of Australian Systematic Biologists.

References

1958 births
Living people
Australian arachnologists
Monash University alumni